The 2015 Bolsover District Council election took place on 7 May 2015 to elect members of Bolsover District Council in Derbyshire, England. The whole council was up for election and the Labour party stayed in overall control of the council.

Election result
Labour remained in control of the council with 32 councillors, while five independents were also elected. The seats in Bolsover South, Pleasely and Shirebrook South West were taken by Labour candidates without opposition.

Ward results

By-elections between 2015 and 2019
A by-election was held in Bolsover South on 8 October 2015, following the death of Labour councillor James Hall. The seat was won by Labour candidate Pat Cooper.

References

2015
2015 English local elections
May 2015 events in the United Kingdom
2010s in Derbyshire